Helliar Holm is an uninhabited island off the coast of Shapinsay in the Orkney Islands, Scotland. It is home to a  lighthouse, which was built in 1893 and automated in 1967. It is a tidal island that used to be connected to Shapinsay. It is still possible to walk across from the mainland during very low tides.

The island also has the ruins of a broch, cairn and chapel.

In the Orkneyinga Saga it is referred to as both "Hellisey" and "Eller Holm"  and John of Fordun refers to it as "Helene-holm"

Gallery

See also

 List of lighthouses in Scotland
 List of Northern Lighthouse Board lighthouses

References

External links
 Northern Lighthouse Board 

Tidal islands of Scotland
Shapinsay
Uninhabited islands of Orkney